Kenyan–Swedish relations are bilateral relations between Kenya and Sweden.

History
Relations between both countries remain cordial.

In the early 1900s the first Swedish companies, explorers, scientists and missionaries came to Kenya.

Development cooperation
Sweden is cooperating with Kenya on the long-term goal of making Kenya a high-middle-income country through Vision 2030 based on the economic, social and political pillars. Sweden also recognises that Kenya plays a key role in regional peace and stability.

Key areas for Kenya and Swedish cooperation are:
Poverty reduction
Governance
Natural Resources and Environment
Urban Development

In 2012 humanitarian assistance from Sweden to Kenya totalled KES. 900 million (EUR. 8.7 million). Total Swedish support for development programmes is estimated at KES. 5.2 billion (EUR. 50.2 million).

Economic relations
In 1973 both countries signed a double tax avoidance agreement. Between 2003 and 2012 trade between both countries increased 310%.

In 2012 trade Kenya exported goods worth KES. 4.9 billion (EUR. 47.34 million) to Sweden. In addition, Sweden exported goods worth KES. 6.3 billion (EUR. 61 million).

Kenya's main exports to Sweden include: coffee, cut flowers, fruits and vegetables.

Sweden's main exports to Kenya include: telecommunication equipment, paper, machinery, manufactured products, medical equipment and vehicles.

Over 50 Swedish multinational corporations such as ABB, Alfa Laval, Atlas Copco, Bahco, Ericsson, Saab, Sandvik, Scania, SKF, TetraPak and Volvo have operations in Kenya. Majority of the firms run their Africa operations from Nairobi.

Kenya is considered an access point to East African markets.

Diplomatic missions
Kenya has an embassy in Stockholm. It is also accredited to Denmark, Finland, Iceland and Norway. Sweden has an embassy in Nairobi.

See also 
 Foreign relations of Kenya 
 Foreign relations of Sweden

References

External links
Embassy of Kenya | Stockholm
Embassy of Sweden | Nairobi

 
Sweden
Bilateral relations of Sweden